The Waltham-Lowell system was a labor and production model employed during the rise of the textile industry in the United States, particularly in New England, amid the larger backdrop of rapid expansion of the Industrial Revolution in the early 19th century.

Made possible by inventions such as the spinning jenny, spinning mule, and water frame around the time of the American Revolution, the textile industry was among the earliest mechanized industries, and models of production and labor sources were first explored here.

The system used domestic labor, often referred to as mill girls, who came to the new textile centers from rural towns to earn more money than they could at home, and to live a cultured life in "the city." Their life was very regimented—they lived in the company boardinghouses and were held to strict hours and a moral code.

As competition grew in the domestic textile industry and wages declined, strikes began to occur, and with the introduction of cheaper imported foreign workers by mid-century, the system proved unprofitable and collapsed.

Precursor

The precursor to the Waltham-Lowell system was seen in Rhode Island, where British immigrant Samuel Slater set up his first spinning mills in the 1790s.

Slater drew on his British village experience to create a factory system called the "Rhode Island System," based on the customary patterns of family life in New England villages. Children aged 7 to 12 were the first employees of the mill; Slater personally supervised them closely. The first child workers were hired in 1790. It is highly unlikely that Slater resorted to physical punishment, relying on a system of fines. Slater first tried to staff his mill with women and children from afar, but that fell through due to the close-knit framework of the New England family. He then brought in whole families, creating entire towns. He provided company-owned housing nearby, along with company stores; he sponsored a Sunday School where college students taught the children reading and writing.

Characteristics
The Waltham-Lowell system pioneered the use of a vertically integrated system. Here there was complete control over all aspects of production. Spinning, weaving, dyeing, and cutting were now completed in a single plant. This large amount of control made it so that no other company could interfere with production. The Waltham mill also pioneered the process of mass production. This greatly increased the scale of manufacturing. Water-powered line shafts and belts now connected hundreds of power lines. The increase in manufacturing occurred so rapidly that there was no localized labor supply in the early 19th century that could have sufficed. Lowell solved this problem by hiring young women.

Waltham
After the successes of Samuel Slater, a group of investors now called The Boston Associates and led by Newburyport, Massachusetts merchant Francis Cabot Lowell devised a new textile operation on the Charles River in Waltham, Massachusetts, west of Boston. This new firm, the first in the nation to place cotton-to-cloth production under one roof, was incorporated as the Boston Manufacturing Company in 1814.

The Boston Associates tried to create a controlled system of labor, unlike the harsh conditions they observed while in Lancashire, England. The owners recruited young New England farm girls from the surrounding area to work the machines at Waltham. The mill girls lived in company boarding houses and were subject to strict codes of conduct and supervised by older women. They worked about 80 hours per week. Six days per week, they woke to the factory bell at 4:40 am and reported to work at 5 am before a half-hour breakfast break at 7 am. They worked until a lunch break of 30 to 45 minutes around noon. The workers then returned to their company houses at 7 pm when the factory closed. This system became known as the Waltham System.

Lowell

While the Boston Manufacturing Company proved immensely profitable, the Charles River had very little potential as a power source.  Francis Cabot Lowell died prematurely in 1817, and soon his partners traveled north of Boston to East Chelmsford, Massachusetts, where the large Merrimack River could provide far more power.  The first mills, the Merrimack Manufacturing Company, were running by 1823.  The settlement was incorporated as the town of Lowell in 1826, and became the city of Lowell ten years later.  Boasting ten textile corporations, all running on the Waltham System and each considerably larger than the Boston Manufacturing Company, Lowell became one of the largest cities in New England and the model, now known as the Lowell System, was copied elsewhere in New England, often in other mill towns developed by the Boston Associates.  Examples include Manchester, New Hampshire; Lewiston, Maine; Lawrence, Massachusetts; and Holyoke, Massachusetts.

Decline

Eventually, cheaper and less organized foreign labor replaced the mill girls. Even by the time of the founding of Lawrence in 1845, there were questions being raised about its viability. One of the leading causes of this transition to foreign labor and the demise of the system was the coming of the Civil War. Girls went to be nurses, back to their farms, or into positions that men had left when they went to the army. These girls were out of the mills for the duration of the war and when the mills reopened after the war, the girls were gone because they no longer needed the mills. They had rooted into their new occupations or moved on in life to the point where the mill was no longer suitable for them. The lack of mill girls created a movement towards Irish immigrants.

The Irish community that was building in Lowell, Massachusetts was not exclusively female unlike the grouping of mill girls in the dormitories. The proportion of male employment at the mill increased which rapidly changed the demographics of the people that work there. The Lowell plant became heavily dependent on the foreign lower-class, especially the Irish immigrants that flocked to Massachusetts. This reliance on foreign workers forced the mills to become what they had been trying to avoid with the mill girls. Poverty snuck up on them and they were forced to deal with slums and a poor lower-class. These immigrants tended to have families and they did not live in the dormitory-style of the mill girls. While in many cases the boardinghouses outlived the system, families of immigrant workers typically lived in tenement neighborhoods, and off company property.

See also
Mills and Factories in the Industrial United States
Lowell mill girls

References

Notes

External links 
 Fire map of the Merrimack Manufacturing Company and Dutton and Worthen Street boardinghouses, 1924
 Boardinghouses and their demolition, the 1960s
 More boardinghouses, the 1960s

Economic history of Massachusetts
History of Lowell, Massachusetts
History of the textile industry in the United States